Jose F. Diaz Memorial National High School (JFDMNHS), formerly known as Sto. Niño National High School and founded in 1997, is a public secondary school located in San Mateo, Rizal, Philippines. It is recognized by the Department of Education.

References 

Official Website

High schools in Rizal
Education in San Mateo, Rizal
1997 establishments in the Philippines
Educational institutions established in 1997